Metropolitan Ignatius (Deputatov) (secular name Alexei Mikhailovich Deputatov, ; born 22 January 1977), is a Metropolitan of the Russian Orthodox Church. He presently holds the title of "Bishop of Saratov and Volsky" as well as being the head of the Saratov Metropolitanate.

Early life
Deputatov was born on 22 January 1977 in a working-class family in the village settlement of Tugoles, Shatursky District, Moscow Oblast. Although his father was an Orthodox Priest, early in his life Deputatov was uninterested in religious life, being more interested in pursuing a career in music. He graduated from Shatura high school in 1978. In his early 20s Deputatov started to consider the religious life once again and entered the Ryazan Theological School.

Academic life
From 1994 to 1996 he studied at the Ryazan Theological School. From 1994 to 1998 he attended the Samara Theological Seminary. In the same year he entered the Saint Petersburg Theological Academy, and on 22 November 1998 he was appointed to the role of lector by the rector of the academy, .

In June 2002 he defended his thesis at SPbDA on the topic "Fundamentals of the social concept of the Russian Orthodox Church in the light of the Holy Scriptures of the New Testament." In August 2002, he was appointed a teacher of the subject "Biblical History" at the Ryazan Theological School.

On 23 July 2003, he was appointed by Archbishop Pavel of Ryazan as the vice-rector for educational work of the Ryazan Theological School. Starting in September 2003 he was a professor of the subjects "Pastoral Theology", "Homiletics" and "Fundamentals of the Social Concept of the Russian Orthodox Church."

Religious life

On 31 October 2002, in the church of St. Lazarus the Righteous in the city of Ryazan, Metropolitan Simon ordained him a hierodeacon, and on November 4 of the same year in the Nikolsky church in the city of Skopin, Ryazan region, he became a hieromonk.

Bishop

On 27 July 2011, by the decision of the Holy Synod, he was elected Bishop of Shakhtinsky and Millerovsky. On 18 August 2011, during a divine service in the Cathedral of Christ the Savior, Patriarch Kirill elevated him to the rank of archimandrite. On 21 August 21, in the Transfiguration Cathedral of the Novospassky Monastery, he was ordained Bishop of Shakhtinsky and Millerovsky, which was performed by Patriarch Kirill, Metropolitan of Krutitsky and Kolomna Juvenal (Poyarkov), Metropolitan of Saransk and Mordovia , Archbishop of Istra , Archbishop of Ryazan and Kasimov Paul (Ponomaryov), Archbishop of Kostroma and Galich , Bishop of Rostov and Novocherkassk , Bishop of Bronnitsky , Bishop of Solnechnogorsk Sergius (Chashin), Bishop of Podolsk Tikhon (Zaitsev), and Bishop .

On 27 December 2011, he was relieved of his post as governor of the Transfiguration Monastery in Ryazan. On 26 December 2012, he was approved as the priest archimandrite of the Pokrovsky Verkhnemakeevsky monastery of the village of Verkhne-Makeevka, Rostov region.

On 30 May 2014, by the decision of the Synod, he was appointed Bishop of Vologda and Veliky Ustyug.

On 25 July 2014, he was approved as the priest archimandrite of the Spaso-Prilutsky Monastery in Vologda and the Kirillo-Belozersky Monastery in Kirillov.

During his tenure as metropolitan of Vologda and Veliky Ustyug the number of active parishes in the Vologda Metropolitanate increased from 168 (as of 30 May 2014) to 327 (as of 14 March 2018). The number of active monasteries increased from four (as of 30 May 2014) to eight (as of 14 March 2018), and the number of clerics increased from 117 (as of 30 May 2014) to 227 (as of 14 March  2018).

On 26 February 2019 Ignatius replaced Mark (Golovkov) in the patriarchal administration of the Russian Orthodox church. Along with the resignation of the metropolitan of St. Petersburg, this was seen by some observers and journalists as part of an ongoing trend of Kirill removing old bishops mostly ordained and appointed by his predecessor and replacing them with younger bishops who reflect his personality and views.

On 25 August 2020, by the decision of the Holy Synod, he was appointed the Metropolitan of Saratov and Volsk, the head of the Saratov Metropolitanate, with the dismissal of his previous posts. On 28 August 2020, he celebrated the last Divine Liturgy at the Saint Sophia Cathedral in Vologda, co-served with his successor, Metropolitan . On 20 November 2020, he was approved as the priest archimandrite of the Spaso-Preobrazhensky monastery in Saratov, and on 29 December 2020 as the priest archimandrite of the St. Nicholas monastery also in Saratov.

References

1977 births
Living people
People from Shatursky District
Bishops of the Russian Orthodox Church
Russian Orthodox Christians from Russia
21st-century Eastern Orthodox bishops